Rimo is both a mountain in the Karakoram and the name of the subrange in which it lies:

 Rimo I, the main summit of the mountain
 Rimo Muztagh, the full name of the subrange